The Società Veneta (SV) was an Italian public transport company running trains and tramways. Its initial full name was the Società Veneta per le  e costruzioni pubbliche (Società Veneta for public business and construction), though from 1898 to 1977 it was known as the Società Veneta per la costruzione e l'esercizio di ferrovie secondarie italiane (Società Veneta for the construction and running of Italian secondary railways).

History
It was formed in Padua on 11 January 1872 and also worked on the construction of housing and other railway-related buildings and infrastructure. In the first half of the 20th century it was the largest railway operating company in Italy, managing lines in central and northern Italy. The company effectively ceased operation in 1986 but the section between Venice and San Giorgio di Nogaro is now part of the Venice–Trieste railway.

Routes

Standard gauge railways 

Maps

Narrow gauge railways

Tramways 

Track gauge
For more on the 1445 mm gauge see: Track gauge in Italy.

Maps

Rolling stock

In 1915, locomotives were re-numbered in the following groups:

    1-139, for narrow-gauge locomotives
    140-199, for standard gauge tramway locomotives
    200-299, for four-coupled locomotives, e.g. 0-4-0
    300-399, for six-coupled locomotives, e.g. 0-6-0
    400-499, for eight-coupled locomotives, e.g. 0-8-0

See also
 Sistemi Territoriali

References

Bibliography

Giovanni Cornolò, La Società Veneta Ferrovie, 2nd edition, Ponte San Nicolo, Duegi editrice, 2005. .

Transport companies established in 1872
Defunct railway companies of Italy
Transport in Veneto
1872 establishments in Italy